Parli-II is a village in Palakkad district in the state of Kerala, India. Parli-I and Parli-II come under the administration of the Parli gram panchayat.

Demographics
 India census, Parli-II had a population of 16,139 with 7,870 males and 8,269 females.

References

Villages in Palakkad district